The Toronto Harbour Light is an automated lighthouse at Vicki Keith Point on the Leslie Street Spit in Toronto, Ontario, Canada.

Construction
The concrete structure was completed in 1974 by the then Toronto Harbour Commission. It is now operated by the Toronto Port Authority. The lighthouse is powered by a solar panel and directs shipping traffic along the Eastern Channel into Toronto Harbour.

See also
 List of lighthouses in Ontario
 List of lighthouses in Canada

Further reading

 Crompton, Samuel Willard  & Michael J. Rhein. The Ultimate Book of Lighthouses (2002) ; .
 Jones, Ray,  & Roberts, Bruce (Photographer). Eastern Great Lakes Lighthouses (Lighthouse Series) (Paperback) (Old Saybrook, CN: The Globe Pequot Press) .
 Jones, Ray.The Lighthouse Encyclopedia, The Definitive Reference (Globe Pequot, January 1, 2004, 1st ed.) ; .
 Oleszewski, Wes. Great Lakes Lighthouses, American and Canadian: A Comprehensive Directory/Guide to Great Lakes Lighthouses, (Gwinn, Michigan: Avery Color Studios, Inc., 1998) .
Penrose, Laurie & Penrose, Bill T., (1994-05) A Traveler's Guide to 100 Eastern Great Lakes: Lighthouses (Paperback), Friede Publications, 125 pages , p. 79.
 Wright, Larry and Wright, Patricia. Great Lakes Lighthouses Encyclopedia Hardback (Erin: Boston Mills Press, 2006)

External links
 The Toronto Harbour Light
 Aids to Navigation Canadian Coast Guard

Lighthouses completed in 1974
Buildings and structures in Toronto
Lighthouses in Ontario
1974 establishments in Ontario